Frankie Goes to Hollywood is a computer game that was developed by Denton Designs and published by Ocean Software Ltd in 1985 for the Commodore 64, Amstrad CPC and ZX Spectrum home computers.  The game is based on the teachings of the UK band Frankie Goes to Hollywood.

Objective

The game puts the player in Liverpool in search of the Pleasuredome. The player has to find and use various objects and play minigames to reach the goal. The player starts the game as a simple character, to reach the Pleasuredome one has to become a full person. To become a full person, the four attributes (sex, war, love and faith) must be filled to 99%. The attributes are boosted by completing tasks in the game. Additional pleasure points can be scored by playing the minigames. The four attributes are part of the symbols used on the covers of Frankie Goes to Hollywood's albums.

During the game, a murder takes place. All the rooms the player can visit contain clues in order to find the murderer. The clues are in pairs, helping eliminate suspects. For example, the player may be told "The killer is an atheist" and "Mr Somebody is a regular church-goer" - so Mr Somebody would be innocent. In theory, the game cannot be completed without making the correct accusation (by returning to the room with the body) - there is a large bonus of Pleasure Points for naming the killer.

List of minigames
Sea of Holes
The Terminal Room
Cybernetic Breakout
Cupid's Arrows
Raid Over Merseyside
Talking Heads
Shooting Gallery
War Room
Flower Power
ZTT Room

Development
The game was developed by Denton Designs and the game was based on the engine for Gift from the Gods.

Music
Certain versions of the game feature chiptune versions of the band's songs such as "Relax" and "Welcome to the Pleasuredome". The ZX Spectrum version features an adaptation of "Two Tribes" as the title music. The game package also included a live version of "Relax" on tape cassette.

Reception

Roy Wagner reviewed the game for Computer Gaming World, and stated that "The graphics and game play are well done. I think you will find it an interesting game."

In 1991, Your Sinclair included the game at number 71 in their list of the Top 100 Best Spectrum Games of All Time. In 1993, Commodore Force ranked the game at number one on its list of the top 100 Commodore 64 games.

Sex/Pleasure/Lust
The first icon, represented by two sperm in a yin yang image, is variously described as either Sex, Lust or Pleasure. The game inlay refers to the icon as Pleasure, the music press usually referred to it as Sex, and some computer magazines occasionally used the term Lust instead.

References

External links

Images of Commodore 64 version of Frankie Goes To Hollywood box and manual at C64Sets.com
Frankie Goes to Hollywood at GameFAQs
Frankie Goes to Hollywood retrospective at Rock, Paper, Shotgun
https://web.archive.org/web/20110114183532/http://www.popmatters.com/pm/column/134877-frankie-goes-to-hollywood-commodore-64-ocean-software-1985/ at Popmatters

1985 video games
Action-adventure games
Amstrad CPC games
Band-centric video games
Commodore 64 games
Denton Designs games
Minigame compilations
Ocean Software games
Single-player video games
Video games based on musicians
Video games developed in the United Kingdom
Video games scored by Fred Gray
ZX Spectrum games